The southern barred triplefin, Brachynectes fasciatus, is a triplefin of the family Tripterygiidae and only member of the genus Brachynectes, found around Australia's south coast including Tasmania at depths down to 13 m. Its length is only up to about 41 mm.

The southern barred triplefin is found in rock pools and amongst seagrass beds.

References

Tripterygiidae
Fish of Australia
Fish described in 1957